Euclinia is a genus of flowering plants in the family Rubiaceae. The genus is found in tropical Africa and Madagascar.

Species 
Euclinia longiflora Salisb. - tropical India
Euclinia squamifera (R.D.Good) Keay - Cameroon, Gabon, Cabinda Province
Euclinia suavissima (Homolle ex Cavaco) J.-F.Leroy - Madagascar

References

External links 
 Euclinia in the World Checklist of Rubiaceae

Rubiaceae genera
Gardenieae